Birding Scotland is a quarterly Scottish birding magazine. The editors are H. I. Scott and Stuart Rivers.

The original advertising slogan was "Made in Scotland for birders", a take on the iconic Irn-Bru campaign "Made in Scotland from girders".

See also
List of journals and magazines relating to birding and ornithology

External links
 

Magazines published in Scotland
Quarterly magazines published in the United Kingdom
Journals and magazines relating to birding and ornithology
Magazines established in 1998
Wildlife magazines
Ornithology in Scotland
1998 establishments in Scotland
Mass media in Aberdeen